The Battle of Dutumi was fought during the East African Campaign of World War I.

References

See also 
 Dutumi

Battles of the East African Campaign
September 1916 events
1916 in German East Africa